Charity Hospital was one of two teaching hospitals which were part of the Medical Center of Louisiana at New Orleans (MCLNO), the other being University Hospital. Three weeks after the events of Hurricane Katrina, then-Governor Kathleen Blanco said that Charity Hospital would not reopen as a functioning hospital. The Louisiana State University System, which owns the building, stated that it had no plans to reopen the hospital in its original location. It chose to incorporate Charity Hospital into the city's new medical center in the lower Mid-City neighborhood. The new hospital completed in August 2015 was named University Medical Center New Orleans.

Organization
Charity Hospital was one of several public hospitals around the state of Louisiana administered by the Louisiana State University System at the time of Hurricane Katrina. Charity Hospital and the nearby University Hospital were both teaching hospitals affiliated with the LSU Health Sciences Center in New Orleans (LSUHSC-NO). University Hospital, later called Interim LSU Hospital, closed in 2015.

Prior to Katrina, Charity Hospital operated in the New Orleans Hospital District at 1532 Tulane Avenue, New Orleans, Louisiana  70112–1352. The building is approximately six-tenths of a mile on the opposite side of I-10 from Interim LSU Hospital.

History

Charity Hospital was founded on May 10, 1736, by a grant from Jean Louis, a French sailor and shipbuilder, who died in New Orleans the year before.  His last will and testament was to finance a hospital for the indigent in the colony of New Orleans from his estate.

Charity Hospital was originally named the Hospital of Saint John or L’Hôpital des Pauvres de la Charité (The Charity Hospital for the Poor).  The first Charity Hospital was located on the intersection of Chartres Street and Bienville Street in what is now the French Quarter.  The hospital was founded 18 years after the city was founded by France in 1718.  It was the second oldest continuously operated public hospital in the United States.  Only Bellevue Hospital in New York City is older, having been founded a month earlier, on March 31, 1736.

Charity Hospital quickly outgrew its original facility, and a second hospital was built at the edge of the colony on Basin Street in 1743.  A third hospital was built nearby in 1785.  It was renamed the San Carlos Hospital in honor of King Charles III, King of Spain, after New Orleans was ceded to Spain in 1763.

A fire destroyed this hospital in 1809.  Without a building, a temporary hospital was established at the Cabildo for a month, then at the Jourdan residence in the Faubourg Marigny for six months, then the dilapidated De La Vergne plantation for 5 years while a fourth hospital was built.  This new hospital was built at the edge of the city on Canal Street where The Roosevelt New Orleans Hotel is currently located.  The hospital was completed in 1815, but this hospital was widely criticized as inadequate and underfunded.

In 1832, a fifth hospital was built on Common Street (modern Tulane Avenue) between Howard Street (modern LaSalle Street), Robertson Street, and Gravier Street, on the edge of the Faubourg St. Marie. This hospital came under the administration of the Sisters of Charity in 1834, who would run the hospital for the next century.  

In that year Charity also began its long history as a teaching hospital with the founding of The Medical College of Louisiana by three American physicians new to the city: Dr. Thomas Hunt, of South Carolina, Dr. Warren Stone, of Vermont, and Dr. John Harrison, of Washington, D.C., using various locations including Charity Hospital which was "open every day for the attendance of the students". In 1843 the college petitioned the Legislature for land to build a medical school building with the provision that the faculty would care for the patients of Charity free of charge for 10 years, a tradition which continued into the 1960s. In 1847 the Legislature established the University of Louisiana, and the Medical College of Louisiana was assumed into the school, becoming the Medical Department of the University of Louisiana. The hospital in the 1850s was probably the largest hospital in the world, with 1,000 beds, 200 more than the eminent Hotel Dieu in Paris. In 1884 Paul Tulane bequeathed the massive sum of $1.25 million dollars to establish the Tulane University of Louisiana, and the Medical Department of the University of Louisiana, until now state-supported, became part of the private Tulane University. In 1931 the Louisiana State University School of medicine was established on the grounds of the Charity complex along Tulane Avenue, on the opposite side from Tulane. When the sixth Charity was built in 1939, the new structure was in the shape of an H, modified to comply with the segregation laws of the time. Each wing belonged to Tulane or LSU’s medical service. To divide incoming patients equally, patients with an even medical record number were assigned to one school, and those with an odd number to the other. (https://www.tulane.edu/~matas/historical/charity/charity.htm)

During the yellow fever epidemic of 1858, 2,727 patients were admitted and of them 1,382 died of the disease. Total patient admission that year was 11,337, being 9,135 males and 2,202 females.

By the 20th century, the city of New Orleans was rapidly expanding, and the demand for indigent medical services again exceeded Charity Hospital capacity.  A sixth hospital was built on Tulane Avenue in 1939. At the time it was the second largest hospital in the United States with 2,680 beds.

The building's cornerstone lists the Federal Emergency Administration of Public Works (later called the Public Works Administration) as the building authority.  The architects were Weiss, Dreyfous & Seiferth, who were also responsible for the Louisiana State Capitol in Baton Rouge.  The hospital features two stone bas-reliefs and a cast-aluminum screen called Louisiana at Work and Play, all by artist Enrique Alférez.

The LSU Health Sciences Center in New Orleans (LSUHSC-NO) was built adjacent to Charity Hospital in 1931 under the aegis of Louisiana Governor Huey Pierce Long. Serving one of the largest populations of uninsured citizens, Charity Hospital also boasted the #2 Level I Trauma Center in the nation, with the #1 rank belonging to Cook County Hospital in Chicago, Illinois.

In 1968, the hospital lost a malpractice case before the U.S. Supreme Court. In Louise Levy, Administratrix v. Louisiana through the Charity Hospital of Louisiana at New Orleans Board of Administrators, et al., the court ruled that a child born out of wedlock could not be prevented from suing on behalf of a deceased parent.

The Louisiana Department of Health and Human Resources (DHH) took control of Charity Hospital in 1970.  The hospital was transferred to the Louisiana Health Care Authority (LHCA) in 1991 and to the LSU System in 1997.

Hurricane Katrina
Like its sister hospital, University Hospital, Charity Hospital sustained severe flood damage during Hurricane Katrina. The evacuation of patients from the flooded hospital made national headlines. After the storm, a temporary clinic named the Spirit of Charity was established at the Convention Center. The temporary Spirit of Charity Clinic was later relocated to the New Orleans Centre building adjacent to the Superdome. In February 2007, a renovated University Hospital had taken over interim responsibilities of emergency care to the city which Charity originally provided. In August 2015, the LSU Health Sciences Center completed the new $1.1 billion medical center named University Medical Center New Orleans. The hospital consolidated the functions of both the already closed Charity Hospital and University Hospital.

Failed campaign to rebuild Charity Hospital
The Foundation for Historical Louisiana, as charged in HCR 89 of the 2006 Louisiana Legislature, hired the internationally renowned architectural firm, RMJM Hillier, to "…examine and evaluate the entire Big Charity structure to determine the advisability of repairing or restructuring the entire facility." RMJM Hillier determined the art deco building to be structurally sound—with its original design being architecturally exceptional and "ahead of its time." Rehabilitation into a 21st-century, state-of-the-art facility would be the fastest, most cost-effective way to return quality healthcare and a teaching hospital to New Orleans. This idea was scrubbed in favor of using University Hospital as an interim hospital and building University Medical Center New Orleans and a new Southeast Louisiana Veterans Health Care System Medical Center in the adjacent neighborhood of lower Mid-City.

Plans to re-develop the site 
There have been several efforts to renovate or restore Charity Hospital. In October 2019, LSU, the organization that has owned the structure since the 2005 evacuation and subsequent closure of the hospital, approved a re-development project to turn the former hospital into a mix of homes, retail space and other facilities. The redevelopment project had been long-awaited by city leaders hoping to revitalize the former "booming" central business district that has been suffering since the closure of Charity and surrounding buildings due to Hurricane Katrina. The contract was awarded to a group called 1532 Tulane Partners, a joint venture between New Orleans-based CCNO and Israeli development company El-Ad Group. Work was expected to begin on the giant building in Fall 2019 and construction was predicted to take 3 years. The redevelopment project was expected to cost $300 million that would have been partly funded by tax credits, and the building would not have been subject to property tax as the building will still be owned by LSU. The structure was projected to include about 390 residential units plus retail shops and restaurants. Tulane University was expected to serve as the main tenant of the building as they will use it for student housing and offices.

Television
Charity Hospital was featured in the TLC documentary series, Code Blue.
The series documented the lives of the hospital physicians and their patients. The episodes often illustrated the rate of violence in New Orleans by chronicling the high volume of patients who were treated in the emergency department with gunshot or stab wounds.

Charity Hospital was also featured in two episodes of TLC's Trauma: Life in the ER, which focused on Charity's emergency department,.

Charity Hospital was also in an episode of NY Med, where a doctor reminisces of his time spent at the hospital.

It was also briefly featured in MTV’s The Real World: New Orleans, where Kelly stops by to visit her boyfriend Peter, who works there.

Film
 Big Charity, a documentary film by Alexander John Glustrom, tells the untold story behind the death of Charity Hospital and unveils the truth about one of the largest single payouts of federal disaster funds in state history.

 The 2013 film Hours featured the hospital as the main focus of the story line as a father struggles to keep his infant daughter alive in the wake of Hurricane Katrina.

 Part two of director Spike Lee's four-part 2010 documentary If God Is Willing and da Creek Don't Rise features a lengthy segment on the battle over the future of Charity Hospital, featuring testimonials from doctors, politicians, historic preservation advocates, community activists, and other New Orleanians who fought to save the facility.

Books

Non-fiction
 Salvaggio, John E. New Orleans' Charity Hospital (1992).
 The last days of Charity Hospital were documented in Jim Carrier's book, Charity – The Heroic and Heartbreaking Story of Charity Hospital in Hurricane Katrina (2015).

Fiction
 In the 1980 novel A Confederacy of Dunces by John Kennedy Toole, one of Charity Hospital's ambulances is mentioned at the end of the story.
 In the 2015 novel Elemental Arcane by Phaedra Weldon, Charity Hospital is one of the locations mentioned.
 In Dolores Redondo's novel La Cara Norte del Corazón (2019), Charity Hospital appears in the last moments before evacuation during Hurricane Katrina.
 In the 2022 novel The Italian Prisoner by Elisa M. Speranza, the main character's sister is a WW2 Army nurse who studied and worked at Charity Hospital before the war.

See also
 Common Ground Health Clinic
 List of the oldest hospitals in the United States
 List of tallest buildings in New Orleans
 Louisiana State University System
 LSU Health Sciences Center New Orleans
 Medical Center of Louisiana at New Orleans
 Tulane University School of Medicine
 University Hospital
 University Medical Center New Orleans

References

External links

 From L'Hospital des Pauvres to University Medical Center: A timeline at The Times-Picayune
 Campaign to Save Charity Hospital
 "Abandoned Southeast" entry on Charity Hospital

1736 establishments in North America
Hospitals established in the 1730s
Hospital buildings completed in the 18th century
Buildings and structures completed in 1736
Hospital buildings completed in 1832
Hospital buildings completed in 1851
Education in New Orleans
Defunct hospitals in Louisiana
Teaching hospitals in Louisiana
Louisiana State University System
Skyscrapers in New Orleans
Tulane University
Healthcare in New Orleans
Skyscrapers in Louisiana
Historically black hospitals in the United States
Effects of Hurricane Katrina
Hospitals disestablished in 2005
2005 disestablishments in Louisiana